Sembcorp Industries (Sembcorp) is an energy and urban development company.

Sembcorp's marine division provided a variety of services, including the engineering and construction of offshore platforms for oil extraction, until it was demerged from Sembcorp in 2020 following poor financial performance. Sembcorp currently has an energy portfolio of over 12,600MW, with more than 2,600MW of renewable energy capacity globally. The company also develops raw land into urban developments.

Sembcorp is listed on the main board of the Singapore Exchange. It is a component stock of the Straits Times Index and sustainability indices including the FTSE4Good Index, the Dow Jones Sustainability Asia Pacific Index and the iEdge SG ESG indices.

In March 2020, it was announced that Sembcorp was replacing their CEO. Sembcorp did not declare an interim dividend for 1H 2020, instead choosing to defer any decision regarding payment of dividends for the fiscal year 2020 until the end of the year. In June of the same year, trading was halted for Sembcorp as well as Sembcorp Marine, a loss-making subsidiary whose shares had declined by 36% in 2020. Representatives from both companies declined to comment. Between 11 June and 24 July 2020, Sembcorp Industries' share price declined by 11%.

Singapore
Sembcorp owns and operates the largest NEWater plant in Singapore, and provides solid waste management services.

It is the only established power gentailer (generation-affiliated retailer) in Singapore to offer renewable energy. Sembcorp also has 250MWp of renewable energy capacity in operation and under development.

China
Sembcorp operates power generation, industrial water and wastewater treatment facilities, and sustainable urban developments.

Sembcorp is an investor in the China-Singapore Suzhou Industrial Park, Wuxi-Singapore Industrial Park, International Water Hub and Singapore-Sichuan Hi-tech Innovation Park.

India
Despite their commitment to renewable energy in China and Singapore, Sembcorp constructed a 1,320-megawatt supercritical coal-fired power plant in Andhra Pradesh. In 2015, they acquired a wind and solar power company, Green Infra. In 2016, Sembcorp launched a $3 billion, 2,640-megawatt power complex in Andhra Pradesh. In 2020, Sembcorp commemorated the completion of 800MW of Solar Energy Corporation of India wind power projects.

United Kingdom 
In 2003, Sembcorp acquired a centralised utilities business at Wilton International, Teesside, UK. In 2018, Sembcorp acquired UK Power Reserve, the UK’s largest flexible distributed energy generator.

Myanmar
In 2015, Sembcorp pivoted away from renewable energy investments, beginning the development of a 225-megawatt gas-fired power plant (the Sembcorp Myingyan Power Plant) which officially opened in 2019. However, solar power generation was integrated into the plant.

Oman
In 2009, Sembcorp won a project to develop the US$1 billion Salalah Independent Water and Power Plant.

United Arab Emirates 
In 2006, Sembcorp started work on the Fujairah 1 Independent Water and Power Plant, a 893 MW and 130 million imperial gallons per day hybrid desalination plans.

Vietnam
In 1996, the first Vietnam Singapore Industrial Park (VSIP) was established in Binh Duong province in southern Vietnam. In 2001, Sembcorp made an investment to develop the Phu My 3 independent power plant. In 2005, Sembcorp expanded its presence in southern Vietnam with VSIP Binh Duong II. In 2007, Sembcorp began a third VSIP project, VSIP Bac Ninh. In 2009, Sembcorp entered a joint venture agreement for its fourth VISP project, VSIP Hai Phong, also an integrated township and industrial park. In 2012, Sembcorp signed an agreement for a fifth project in Vietnam, VSIP Quang Ngai, and in 2015, their sixth and seventh VSIPs - VSIP Hai Duong and VSIP Nghe An. In 2019, Sembcorp signed a joint venture agreement with Becamex IDC Corporation and VSIP.

Bangladesh
In 2019, Sirajganj Unit 4 combined-cycle gas turbine power plant, Sembcorp’s first thermal power plant in Bangladesh, commenced full commercial operation.

Indonesia
Sembcorp was appointed by the Singapore government in the 1990s to develop its first bilateral special economic zones, the 320-hectare Batamindo Industrial Park, on the Riau Island of Batam, and the 270-hectare Bintan Industrial Estate, on Bintan Island. Sembcorp is now developing the Kendal Industrial Park in Central Java.

See also 
 Sembcorp Marine
 Sembcorp Energy India
 SembCorp Logistics
 Water privatization

References

External links
 

Companies listed on the Singapore Exchange
Multinational companies headquartered in Singapore
Service companies of Singapore
Temasek Holdings
Singaporean brands